The Grand Tower Limestone is a geologic formation in Illinois. It preserves fossils dating back to the Devonian period.

See also

 List of fossiliferous stratigraphic units in Illinois

References
 

Devonian Illinois